M1-92 (Minkowski 92) is a protoplanetary nebula.  It was imaged by the Hubble Space Telescope in the 1990s.  The bipolar planetary nebula has a particular form of twin lobes of material that emanates from a central star. Astronomers have dubbed this object as the Footprint Nebula. This nebula is approximately 8000 light years away from Earth.

See also
 List of protoplanetary nebulae

References

External links
 Footprint Nebula Observation Page
 Footprint Nebula Strasbourg astronomical Data Center

Planetary nebulae
Cygnus (constellation)